SOCFIN Group, also known as the Société Financière des Caoutchoucs is a holding company listed on the Luxembourg Stock Exchange, it has direct and indirect interest in oil palm and rubber plantation operations and marketing of oil palm seeds in Asia and Africa. It is majority owned by the Bollore Group of France and the Hubert Fabri family of Luxembourg. The company operates  in various countries through managing subsidiaries involved in joint ventures with governments and entrepreneurs. In 2018, it earned revenues from approximately 130,000 ha of palm oil plantations and 64,000 ha of rubber plantations.

In Africa, it manages assets in Nigeria, Ghana, Sierra Leone, Cameroon and eight other countries while in Asia, it principally operates in Indonesia and Cambodia.

History 
Socfin's history dates back to the trade activities of Belgian agronomist, Adrien Hallet in colonial Congo, Sumatra and Malaya. In the beginning of the twentieth century, the introduction of rubber from the Amazon into Southeast Asia generated excitement among planters and investors including Hallet who went on to invest in some ventures in the booming rubber trade. Hallet arrived Asia from Belgium Congo and had acquired knowledge about the oil palm tree in Africa, when interest was still high in rubber, Hallet decided that the oil palm will be suitable for cultivation in the region and existing labour supply and infrastructure would help distribution. He established an estate in East Aceh,  Sumatra in 1911 and between 1909 and 1917, he expanded the range of his business when he teamed up with two French planters, Franck Posth and Henri Fauconnier in the development  estates in Kuala Selangor, Malaysia.  The outbreak of war stunted the group of the firm and after the war, it was Fauconnier who became most involved in the business.  In 1921, a French banker Rene de Rivaud who was an investor in the business, formed a partnership with Group Hallet to acquire some plantation interests of Bunge and Griser of Belgium.

Deeper investments in research and development, in addition to cooperation with other plantation owners such as Danish owned United Plantations led to improvements in seed selection and plantation supply techniques. Investments from Rivaud and introduction of new methods of supply such as a model based on bulk supply to Europe through local storage in a tank and built shipping infrastructures at Port Klang helped expand the firms operations in the 1920 and early 1930s.

In the 1920s and early 1930s, the company launched an expansion strategy through clearing and planting of oil palm and rubber seeds in Southeast Asia. Plantations were established in Labis, Johore, Pahang and other areas of the region. By the middle of the 1930s, the firm operated sixteen plantations in Asia but they were later restructured to become nine estates managed by eight managers. During the period, the firm managed the interest of the Rivaud and Hallet Groups which included: Compagnie du Combodge,  Plantations des Terres Rouges, Compagnie du Selango and Groupe Hallet.

In the 1990s and 2000s, some changes within the group structure happened in 1996, when Bollore Group acquired the interests of the Rivaud Family and later in 2004, the firm sold its plantation interest in Singapore and Malaysia.

African investments 
SOCFIN and its subsidiaries operates in twelve African countries and a concession area of approximately 175,000 ha of land

African subsidiaries

Asian operations 
Socfin through Socfinasia has a stake in Socfindo, an Indonesian based rubber and oil palm operator. The operation was formally established in 1930 and went to various stages of restructuring.  In 1968, it became a joint venture between Socfin and the Indonesian government.

In Cambodia, Socfin operates rubber plantations in the Mondulkiri province through two companies, SOCFIN-KCD and Covipharma. Its economic land concession in the Bousra community of Cambodia is a partnership with a local developer, Khaou Chuly Development and the concession area include approximately 4270 ha of Sethikula Co possession in Phnom Nam Lyr Wildlife and 2700 ha of Varanasi Co.

Issues

Conflicts with local populations 
In many communities in Africa, oil palm is produced by small scale farmers but the activities of Socfinaf which operates industrial sized oil palm and rubber plantations has caused discontent between the firm and local farmers. Some of this conflict revolves around large scale control of land and displacement of small scale tenant farmers. In Cameroon, oil palm production is dominated by Socfinaf's subsidiary, Socapalm which produces 70% of the country's production. Socapalm's uses of security agents has caused discontent among host communities who accuse the agents of preventing farmers from accessing their own crops while the agents argue that such small scale farms encroach on Socapalm's concession area.

In Sierra Leone, SOCFIN's agreement with the government and subsequent acquisition of land in the Malen community of the Pujehun region provoked tension in the community whereby some farmers felt they did not fully understand the lease agreement between the local chiefs, SOCFIN and the Sierra Leonean government before agreeing to the arrangement.

A 2019 report published by the Swiss NGO Bread for all concluded that the Socfin plantation companies in Liberia had violated customary and, in some cases, private land rights of community members in the course of the plantation's expansions. Based on the report, the local NGO Green Advocates submitted a complaint to the International Finance Corporation (IFC). It has been accepted by the responsible office. In a response, Socfin claimed that the accusations articulated in the report were “greatly exaggerated in its context if not incorrect”.

References

Companies listed on the Luxembourg Stock Exchange